The 2011 U.S. F2000 National Championship is a season of the U.S. F2000 National Championship, an open wheel auto racing series that is the first step in IndyCar's Road to Indy ladder. It is the second full season of the series since its revival in 2010. It follows the first 2011 U.S. F2000 Winterfest winter championship. It consists of 12 races held over 7 race weekends on seven different tracks – two street circuits, two ovals, and three permanent road courses.

Finnish driver Petri Suvanto, in his first season racing in North America, won the championship with five wins and five second-place finishes by 47 points over American Spencer Pigot, the 2010 Skip Barber National Championship winner. British driver Wayne Boyd won two races and finished third while Zach Veach won the season opener but struggled during the second half of the season to wind up fourth in points. Sixteen-year-old New Yorker Luca Forgeois won the National Class over his only full-time National Class rival J. R. Smart.

Drivers and teams

Race calendar and results
The race schedule was announced on October 12, 2010.

Championship standings

Drivers'

Teams'

References

External links
U.S. F2000 National Championship official website

U.S. F2000 National Championship seasons
U.S. F2000 National Championship